Lloyd Bennett Grove is editor at large for The Daily Beast, an American news reporting and opinion website focusing on politics and pop culture. He is also a frequent contributor to New York. He was a gossip columnist for New York Daily News before he left on October 9, 2006, and wrote a fortnightly column for Portfolio.com, the web site of Conde Nast Portfolio Magazine, and was a contributing editor for Portfolio Magazine until it shut down in April 2009.

Early life 
Grove was born in California and grew up in Greenwich, Connecticut. He completed his BA in English at Yale University. While at Yale, Grove had a summer job as an assistant for a show business press agent and reported for the Yale Daily News.

Career 
He has written for the Washington Post, New York Magazine, Vanity Fair and Harper's Bazaar.

Since September 2003, Grove has written a weekday column called Lloyd Grove's Lowdown for the New York Daily News.

He has obtained notoriety for his articles on the following: 
US President George W. Bush's daughter's underage drinking
Actors Tim Robbins' and Susan Sarandon's political influences
Businessman Taki Theodoracopulos's anti-Israel joke
Congressman Jim Moran settling a fight between two girlfriends
Outgoing administration's vandalism of Bush White House
Olbermann's Worst Person of The World for March 13, 2006

References

External links
New York Daily News- Archives

Living people
American male journalists
Yale University alumni
New York Daily News people
IAC (company) people
People from Greenwich, Connecticut
Year of birth missing (living people)